Valerius Herberger (21 April 1562 – 18 May 1627) was a German Lutheran preacher and theologian.

Life
He was born at Fraustadt, Silesia (now Wschowa in Poland). He studied for three years at Freystadt in Silesia (now Kożuchów in Poland), and then entered the University of Frankfort-on-the-Oder. In 1582 he went to Leipzig University.

In 1584 he became a teacher in Fraustadt, in 1590 deacon, and in 1599 pastor. Sigismund III Vasa ordered his congregation to cede their house of worship to the Roman Catholics; Herberger then acquired two private residences, which he gradually transformed into a church. He died in Fraustadt.

Works

In 1613 an epidemic broke out at Fraustadt, and under those circumstances Herberger composed his only hymn, Valet will ich dir geben ("O world, so vain, I leave thee"). It was published in 1614 with a melody by Melchior Teschner.

He was a prolific writer. His most comprehensive work is Magnalia Dei de Jesu scripturæ nucleo et medulla (12 parts, 1601–18), meditations on the Pentateuch, Joshua, Judges, and Ruth, emphasising the revelation of Christ in the Old Testament. Herberger also 
wrote commentaries on Revelation xxi.-xxii. and published them as Himmelsches Jerusalem (1609). Passionszeiger (1611), Trauerbinden or funeral sermons (7 vols., 1611–21), and Evangelische Herzpostille 
(1613) are collections of sermons which may be mentioned.

After his death appeared Epistolische Herzpostille, 97 Predigten über Jesus Sirach, and Stoppelpostille (sermons on various texts). Several of his works were reprinted in the nineteenth century:
 Magnalia Dei: die Grossen Thaten Gottes 1-4 (reprint, ed. Fricke, 1854) 
 Das Himmlische Jerusalem (reprint, ed. Bredt, 1858)
 Erklärung des Haus- und Zucht-Buchs Jesus Sirach in 97 Predigten (reprint, ed. Buchka, 1739)
 Paradies-Blümlein aus der Lustgarten der 150 Psalmen (reprint, ed. Otto, 1862)

References
 Valerius Herberger ccel.org

Notes

Attribution

Further reading
 The Great Works Of God: Part One And Two: The Mysteries Of Christ In The Book Of Genesis, Chapter 1–15 (2010), translated by Matthew Carver
 Valerius Herberger (Hymn-Writer) (Bach-Cantatas)

1562 births
1627 deaths
16th-century German Lutheran clergy
German Lutheran theologians
17th-century German Protestant theologians
People from Wschowa
German male non-fiction writers
17th-century German writers
17th-century German male writers
17th-century German Lutheran clergy
16th-century Lutheran theologians
17th-century Lutheran theologians